Dr. Susmita Mohanty (born 1971) is an Indian spaceship designer, serial space entrepreneur and a climate action advocate. She is well known for her research on space related topics. She co-founded India's first private space start-up, Earth2Orbit in 2009. She is the only space entrepreneur in the world to have started companies on three different continents in Asia, Europe and North America. Susmita is one of the few people to have visited both the Arctic and Antarctica.

Biography 
She was born in Cuttack and was raised up in Ahmedabad. She was highly influenced to venture into space research by her father Nilamani Mohanty who was a former ISRO scientist.

Career 
She completed her bachelor's degree in electrical engineering from Gujarat University and master's degree in Industrial Design from the National Institute of Design in Ahmedabad. She also completed Masters in Space studies from the International Space University in Strasbourg.

She co-founded Moonfront, an aerospace consulting firm based in San Francisco in 2001, which marked her entry into space entrepreneurship. She also co-founded Liquifer System Group (LSG), an aerospace architecture and design firm in Vienna, Austria in 2004. She also served as one of the prominent members of the American Institute of Aeronautics and Astronautics Aerospace Architecture for over a period of ten years while she was residing in California. In 2005, she was conferred with the International Achievement Award for promoting international cooperation. She was included in the elite list of 25 Indians to Watch by the Financial Times magazine in 2012 and also featured on the front cover page of Fortune magazine in 2017.

She was nominated to the World Economic Forum's Global Future Council for Space Technologies for a period of three consecutive years from 2016 to 2019. She was included in the BBC's list of 100 inspiring and influential women from around the world for 2019.

References 

1971 births
Living people
Indian women activists
21st-century Indian women
21st-century Indian people
People from Odisha
People from Cuttack
Gujarat University alumni
International Space University alumni
Indian expatriates in the United States
BBC 100 Women
Indian aerospace engineers
21st-century Indian engineers
Indian women engineers
Engineers from Gujarat
Businesswomen from Gujarat
Indian technology company founders
Indian aerospace businesspeople
21st-century Indian businesswomen
21st-century Indian businesspeople